Amy P. Celico is a Principal of Albright Stonebridge Group (ASG). She is the head of the firm’s China team in Washington, DC. She previously worked as a diplomat for the US Departments of State, Defense, Commerce, and the Office of the US Trade Representative.

Education
Amy Celico graduated with a B.A. with honors in Asian Studies from Mount Holyoke College in 1991. She earned her M.A. in International Economics and Strategic Studies at the Johns Hopkins School of Advanced International Studies. She also attended the Hopkins-Nanjing Center in China.

Career
Previously, she was Deputy Director of the Office of the Chinese Economic Area at the U.S. Department of Commerce. In addition, Amy Celico worked at the U.S. State Department, where she was a Foreign Affairs Analyst in the Bureau of Research and Intelligence and a Vice Consul for economic affairs at the U.S. Consulate in Shanghai.

She has stated that early on in her career, she expected to become a Chinese historian. Turning to a career in the U.S. government was an unexpected career turn for her.

She regularly contributes to global business panels.

References 

Year of birth missing (living people)
Living people
American educators
Mount Holyoke College alumni
Paul H. Nitze School of Advanced International Studies alumni